The Chief Secretary to the Government is the most senior officer in the Malaysian Civil Service, secretary to the Cabinet of Malaysia and secretary-general of the Prime Minister's Department.

History
The title of "Chief Secretary to the Government" in Malaysia dates back to the Federated Malay States. In 1911, it replaced the office of Resident-General as head of the British colonial administration. The inaugural Chief Secretary was Edward Lewis Brockman. After 1936, the administrative powers of Chief Secretary was transferred to the British High Commissioner.

Role
The Chief Secretary to the Government is the head of the Civil Service of Malaysia and the highest-ranking civil servant in the Federal Government of Malaysia. He attends Cabinet meetings as its secretary and monitors the implementation of its policies. He also heads the large Prime Minister's Department, which is in charge of, among others, supporting the Prime Minister, administration of the civil service, state protocol and Islamic affairs.

In addition, the Chief Secretary chairs the meetings of Ministry secretaries-generals and meetings of Department directors-general.

List
The following is the list of Chief Secretaries to the Government:

Living former Chief Secretaries

See also
 Chief Secretary

References

External links
 

Government of Malaysia